"The Big One" is a song written by Gerry House and Devon O'Day, and recorded by American country music artist George Strait.  It was released in October 1994 as the lead single from his album Lead On. The song reached number one on the Billboard Hot Country Songs chart and number 4 on the Canadian RPM Country Tracks chart. It was his 26th number-one hit in the United States.

Content
The song is an uptempo, in which the narrator is a man falling in love. He knows he’s in for the big one now because he is falling in love.

Chart performance
"The Big One" debuted on the U.S. Billboard Hot Country Singles & Tracks for the week of October 8, 1994.

References

1994 singles
1994 songs
George Strait songs
Song recordings produced by Tony Brown (record producer)
Songs written by Gerry House
Songs written by Devon O'Day
MCA Records singles